George Anastasia (born February 5, 1947) is an American author and former writer for The Philadelphia Inquirer. He is widely considered to be an expert on the American Mafia. He was an organized crime investigative reporter, who was once targeted for death by then-Philadelphia crime family boss John Stanfa. He won the Sigma Delta Chi Award and has also been described on a 60 Minutes television profile as "One of the most respected crime reporters in the country." Anastasia lives in Pitman, New Jersey.

Early life and education 
Anastasia was born in South Philadelphia and raised in Westville in South Jersey. He graduated from Gloucester Catholic High School in 1965 and earned a BA in French literature from Dartmouth College. He also studied at Swarthmore College and the University of Florida. Anastasia has served as an adjunct professor/lecturer at Glassboro State College, now called Rowan University, Temple University, and has been a lecturer for the U.S. State Department-sponsored series of weeklong seminars on journalism and organized crime in Bulgaria (2004, 2007), Croatia (2005), Serbia (2006), and Italy (2007).

Literary works 
The now retired former Philadelphia Inquirer reporter is the author of six books, which include The Last Gangster (ReganBooks/Harper Collins, March 2004), a New York Times bestseller that chronicles the demise of the Philadelphia mob. His other books are Blood and Honor (William Morrow & Co., 1991), which Jimmy Breslin called "the best gangster book ever written"; NYT bestseller The Summer Wind (Regan Books/HarperCollins, 1999) about the Thomas Capano-Anne Marie Fahey murder case, and The Goodfella Tapes (Avon Books, 1998), Mobfather (Kensington Books, 1993), and The Ultimate Book of Gangster Movies (Perseus Books, 2011), co-authored with Glen Macnow. His work has appeared in Penthouse, Playboy and The Village Voice. He also has been featured on several network television news magazine reports about organized crime and has worked as a consultant on projects for ABC, the Discovery Channel, the History Channel and the National Geographic Channel.

Anastasia is the author of a novella, The Big Hustle (Philadelphia Inquirer Books, 2001), and has contributed to two anthologies of Italian-American writers, A Sitdown with the Sopranos and Don't Tell Momma. Mob Files, an anthology of articles he has written for The Inquirer, was published in September 2008 by Camino Books.

YouTube 

Anastasia does a YouTube channel called "MobTalk" along with FOX 29's Dave Schratweiser. The channel reports current updates in the organized crime world.

Bibliography 
 Blood and Honor: Inside the Scarfo Mob, the Mafia's Most Violent Family (1991)
 Mobfather: The Story of a Wife And Son Caught in the Web of the Mafia (1993)
 The Goodfella Tapes (1998)
 The Summer Wind: Thomas Capano and the Murder of Anne Marie Fahey (1999)
 The Big Hustle (2001)
 The Last Gangster (2004)
 Mobfiles: Mobsters, Molls and Murder (2008)
 Philadelphia True Noir: Kingpins, Hustles and Homicides (2010)
 The Ultimate Book of Gangster Movies (2011)
 Gotti's Rules: The Story of John Alite, Junior Gotti, and the Demise of the American Mafia (2015)
 Doctor Dealer (2020)

References 

1948 births
Living people
American male journalists
American non-fiction writers
American reporters and correspondents
American writers of Italian descent
Dartmouth College alumni
Gloucester Catholic High School alumni
Non-fiction writers about organized crime in the United States
People from Pitman, New Jersey
People from Westville, New Jersey
Rowan University faculty
Swarthmore College alumni
Temple University faculty
University of Florida alumni
Writers from Philadelphia